Nils Gunnar Hult (born 14 August 1939) is a Swedish former footballer who played the majority of his career at Malmö FF as a goalkeeper. He also represented Team Sweden.

References

External links

1939 births
Association football goalkeepers
Swedish footballers
Allsvenskan players
Malmö FF players
Living people
Sweden international footballers
Sportspeople from Lund